The 2019 China National Baseball League season is the 1st season in the history of the China National Baseball League. The season began on 15 August, with the last scheduled day of the regular season on 13 October.

Standings

Weeks

Week 1

Week 2

Week 3

Week 4

Week 5

Week 6

Finals

Game 1

Game 2

Game 3

Game 4

See also
2019 Major League Baseball season
2019 Nippon Professional Baseball season
2019 KBO League season

References

China National Baseball League seasons
China National Baseball League season
China National Baseball League season